Jeremy Adler is a British scholar and poet, and emeritus professor and senior research fellow at King's College London. As a poet he is known especially for his concrete poetry and artist's books. As an academic he is known for his work on German literature specialising in the Age of Goethe, Romanticism, Expressionism and Modernism with contributions on figures such as Goethe, Hölderlin, and Kafka.

Education
He was born in London in 1947, the son of poet and Holocaust survivor H. G. Adler, and was educated at St Marylebone Grammar School (1958–1966) and Queen Mary College London (1966–1969), where he graduated with a first class degree in German with English. He studied for a PhD at Westfield College London, obtaining his degree in 1978 with a thesis on the chemistry of German polymath Johann Wolfgang Goethe's Elective Affinities under Claus Bock.

Career

He was a lecturer in German at Westfield College London (1974–1991) and was awarded a personal chair at Queen Mary and Westfield College London (1991–1994). He was professor of German and head of department at King’s College London (1994–2004).

He was a council member of the Poetry Society (1973–1977) and a member of the Bielefeld Colloquium für neue Poesie (1979–2003). He was awarded the Goethe Prize of the English Goethe Society (1977) and a Stipend of the Herzog August Bibliothek, Wolfenbüttel (1979, 1985, 1990). He was a joint honorary secretary of the English Goethe Society (1986–2004) and a council member of the International Goethe Society (1995–2003). For ten years he was founding chairman of the Marie-Louise von Motesiczky Charitable Trust (1996–2006). He was a fellow at the Institute of Advanced Study, Berlin (1985–1986; 2012). Since 1989 he was a member of the Austrian PEN-Club. In 2005 he was elected a corresponding member of the German Academy of Language and Literature. He has been engaged politically, e.g. reporting on Czechoslovakia's Velvet Revolution in 1989, or in his critique of the new edition of Mein Kampf in the Sueddeutsche Zeitung in 2016 and the Open Letter he organised to the European Heads of State, also in 2016. He has written widely on Brexit and the future of Europe in the German-speaking press.

As a poet, he has been active on the literary scene since the 1960s, initially writing experimental poetry in the circle connected with the Poetry Society. He published alongside experimentalists like Bob Cobbing, Cris Cheek, Lawrence Upton and Bill Griffiths, bringing out over a dozen poetry books and pamphlets. He has been represented in numerous exhibitions, such as Sprachen jenseits von Dichtung (1979), [The Open and Closed Book] at the Victoria and Albert Museum and [Vom Aussehen der Woerter] at the Kunstmuseum Hannover, and in anthologies such as Typewriter Art (2014) and A Human Document (2014). This side of his work – poetry, drawings, artists' books – is represented in many major collections including the Victoria and Albert Museum (London), the Herzog August Bibliothek (Wolfenbüttel), the New York Public Library, the Sackner Archive (Florida), the Getty Museum (Los Angeles), the Special Collection, Maughan Library, King's College London, the Staatsgalerie Stuttgart, the Department of Prints and Drawings, British Museum (London) and Tate Britain. He held a retrospective of his drawings and concrete poems at the National Library of Czechoslovakia, Prague, in 1997. Poems of his have been set to music by Gerhard Lampersberg and Wolfgang Florey. His translations of poems by August Stramm have also been set to music by Michael Nyman in War Works (2014). His novel The Magus of Portobello Road appeared in 2015. His second novel A Night at the Troubadour came out in 2017.

Since the 1980s he has regularly produced literary journalism, writing for The Times, The Guardian, The Independent, The European and The New York Times as well as for the London Review of Books. He is a regular contributor to the Times Literary Supplement. His work has been translated into French, German, Dutch, Swedish, Russian, Turkish, and Japanese.

Adler received an Honorary Silver Medal of Jan Masaryk at the Czech Republic Ambassador's residence in London in November 2019.

Scholarly books, editions, translations

 1979 Ed. (with J.J. White): August Stramm. Kritische Essays und unveröffentliches Quellenmaterial aus dem Nachlass des Dichters.
 1986 Ed. Allegorie und Eros. Texte von und über Albert Paris Gütersloh.
 1987 "Eine fast magische Anziehungskraft". Goethes "Wahlverwandtschaften" und die Chemie seiner Zeit.
 1987 (with Ulrich Ernst): Text als Figur. Visuelle Poesie von der Antike bis zur Moderne, Second, revised edition, 1988. Third edition, 1990.
 1990 Ed. August Stramm: Die Dichtungen. Sämtliche Gedichte, Dramen. Prosa.
 1990 Ed. August Stramm: Alles ist Gedicht. Briefe, Gedichte, Bilder.
 1998 Ed. Friedrich Hölderlin, Selected Poems and Fragments, translated by Michael Hamburger.
 1998 Ed. H.G. Adler, Der Wahrheit verpflichtet. Interviews, Gedichte, Essays.
 1999 Ed. (With Richard Fardon) Franz Baermann Steiner: Selected Writings; Volume 1: Taboo, Truth and Religion.
 1999 Ed. (With Richard Fardon) Franz Baermann Steiner: Selected Writings, Volume 2: Orientalism, Value and Civilization.
 1999 Ed. H.G. Adler, Eine Reise. Roman.
 1999 Introduction E.T.A. Hoffmann: The Life and Opinions of the Tomcat Murr.
 2000 Ed. Franz Baermann Steiner: Am stürzenden Pfad. Gesammelte Gedichte.
 2000 Ed. (With T.J. Reed and Martin Swales). Goethe at 250. London Symposium / Goethe mit 250. Londoner Symposion.
 2001 Franz Kafka.
 2002 Ed. (with Martin Swales and Ann Weaver). Elizabeth M. Wilkinson and L. A. Willoughby, Models of Wholeness. Some Attitudes to Language, Art and Life in the Age of Goethe.
 2002 (Ed.) H.G. Adler, Eine Reise. Roman.
 2003 Ed. (with Richard Fardon and Carol Tully) From Prague Poet to Oxford Anthropologist: Franz Baermann Steiner Celebrated. Essays and Translations.
 2003 Ed.(with Kristian Wachinger) Elias Canetti, Party im Blitz.
 2005 Ed. H.G. Adler, Theresienstadt 1941–1945. Das Antlitz einer Zwangsgemeinschaft.
 2005 Ed. Elias Canetti, Party in the Blitz. The English Years.
 2005 Ed. Elias Canetti, Aufzeichnungen für Marie-Louise.
 2006 Ed. (With Birgit Sander) Marie-Louise von Motesiczky 1906–1996. The Painter / Die Malerin.
 2007 Ed. (With Carol Tully) H.G. Adler, Über Franz Baermann Steiner. Brief an Chaim Rabin.
 2008 Ed. (With Richard Fardon) Franz Baermann Steiner, Zivilisation und Gefahr. Schriften zur Anthropologie, Politik, und Religion.
 2010 Ed. and translated (with Charlie Louth), Friedrich Hölderlin, Essays and Letters.
 2011 Ed. (with Katrin Kohl and Franz Hocheneder), H.G. Adler Andere Wege. Gesammelte Gedichte.
 2013 Ed. (with Peter Filkins) H.G. Adler Nach der Befreiung. Ausgewaehlte Essays zur Geschichte und Soziologie. 
 2014 Ed. (with Peter Filkins) H. G. Adler Orthodoxie des Herzens. Ausgewaehlte Essays zu Literatur, Judentum und Politik.
 2014 Ed. (with Gesa Dane) Literatur und Anthropologie. H.G. Adler, Elias Canetti und Franz Baermann Steiner in London.
 2015 Das bittere Brot. H.G.Adler, Elias Canetti und Franz Baermann Steiner im Londoner Exil.
 2017 Ed. (With Amy Loewenhaar) H.G. Adler. Theresienstadt 1941–1945. The Face of a Coerced Community.
 2017 Das absolut Boese. Zur Neuedition von 'Mein Kampf'.

Poetry books, pamphlets, artist's books

 1973 Alphabox
 1974 Alphabet Music
 1974 Four Sonnets
 1976 The Amsterdam Quartet
 1977 Fragments Towards the City
 1977 Six Triplets
 1978 Even in April, Ferrara and Liberty
 1978 The Little Fruitgum Memory Book
 1979 A Short History of London
 1979 Triplets. 24 Poems
 1979 Vowel Jubilee
 1980 Notes from the Correspondence
 1980 The Wedding and Other Marriages
 1980 Triplets. 24 Poems with 6 Etchings by Friedrich Danielis
 1983 Notes from the Correspondence with etchings by Sylvia Finzi
 1985 Homage to Theocritus
 1986 The Electric Alphabet
 1986 An Alphabet
 1987 Big Skies and Little Stones
 1987 All in a Tiz
 1987 Familiar Signs
 1990 Six Visual Sonnets
 1991 Soap Box
 1993 To Cythera! 4 poems with etchings by Friedrich Danielis
 1994 At the Edge of the World
 1996 The Electric Alphabet, with etchings by Jiři Sindler

References

1947 births
Living people
Academics of King's College London
English Jews
English people of Czech-Jewish descent
English male poets
 Recipients of the Silver Medal of Jan Masaryk